Tatjana Jaanson (before 1991; Borissova; born on 23 November 1966 in Moscow) is a Russian-born Estonian rower and politician. She was a member of XII Riigikogu.

In 2008, she was awarded with Order of the White Star, IV class. She was married to Estonian rower and politician Jüri Jaanson.

References

Living people
1966 births
Estonian female rowers
Social Democratic Party (Estonia) politicians
Russian emigrants to Estonia
Estonian people of Russian descent
Members of the Riigikogu, 2011–2015
Recipients of the Order of the White Star, 4th Class
University of Tartu alumni
Politicians from Moscow